Wanda Koop  is a Canadian interdisciplinary artist who lives and works in Winnipeg, Manitoba.

Life
Koop was born on November 5, 1951 in Vancouver, British Columbia, to Russian Mennonite parents who had escaped the Russian Revolution. Koop graduated from the  Lemoine FitzGerald School of Art, University of Manitoba, Winnipeg in 1973.

In 2002 Koop was awarded the Queen Elizabeth II Golden Jubilee Medal, in 2005 she was elected to the Royal Canadian Academy of Arts, in 2006 she was appointed a member of the Order of Canada, and in 2016 she received the Governor General's Awards in Visual and Media Arts.

Koop and her mother were the subjects of the 2007 documentary Wanda Koop: In Her Eyes about their visit to the Ukraine, where Koop's mother was born.

Work
While still studying at the University of Manitoba School of Art, in 1972, Koop's work was included in an exhibition at the Winnipeg Art Gallery. Throughout the 1980s, 1990s, and 2000s, Koop was the subject of numerous solo exhibitions, including the 1985 travelling exhibition Airplanes and the Wall; the 1991 travelling exhibition Wanda Koop: Recent Paintings; and the 1998 exhibit See Everything, See Nothing at The New Gallery. From February 18 to May 15, 2011 her solo exhibition entitled On The Edge Of Experience was shown at the National Gallery of Canada in Ottawa, Ontario.

Koop's work often combines aspects of video, performance, or photography. As Robin Laurence describes in the Spring 2000 issue of Canadian Art, Koop "is interested in expanding the languages of paint and video, integrating them into the complex terms of loss and grief and reclamation."

Her “Barcode Face” series created a new Canadian landscape. Koop revisited the series in 2021, as it was included in the group exhibition, A Thought Sublime at Marianne Boesky Gallery in New York City. In 2022, her exhibition View From Here was one of the shows which accompanied the opening of the new Inuit art building at the Winnipeg Art Gallery. Also in 2022, her exhibition Wanda Koop: Lightworks was shown at the McMichael Canadian Art Collection.

Community activism
In addition to her art, Koop is an ardent community activist. In 1998 she founded Art City, a community art centre in Winnipeg's West Broadway neighbourhood as a way to bring together contemporary visual artists and inner-city youth.

Selected Awards and Honours 
 Queen Elizabeth II Golden Jubilee Medal (2002)
 Doctor of Letters from the University of Winnipeg (2002)
 Order of Canada (2006)
 honorary Doctorate from the Emily Carr Institute of Art & Design in Vancouver (2007)
 honorary Doctor of Laws from the University of Manitoba (2009)
 Queen Elizabeth II Diamond Jubilee Medal (2012)
 Governor General's Award in Visual and Media Arts (2016)

References

External links
 

1951 births
Living people
20th-century Canadian women artists
21st-century Canadian women artists
Artists from Vancouver
Artists from Winnipeg
Mennonite artists
Canadian landscape painters
Canadian people of Russian descent
Canadian women painters
Canadian Mennonites
Members of the Order of Canada
Members of the Order of Manitoba
Governor General's Award in Visual and Media Arts winners